Thorsten Rudolph (born 15 March 1974) is a German politician of the Social Democratic Party (SPD) who has been serving as a member of the Bundestag since 2021.

Early life and education
Rudolph was born 1974 in the West German city of Koblenz and studied law and economics at the University of Bonn.

Career
From 2009 to 2021, Rudolph worked at the State Ministry of Finance and at the State Chancellery of Rhineland-Palatinate.

Political career
Rudolph entered the SPD in 1989 and entered the Bundestag in 2021, representing the Koblenz district. In parliament, he has since been serving on the Budget Committee and its Subcommittee on European Affairs. In 2022, he also joined the parliamentary body charged with overseeing a 100 billion euro special fund to strengthen Germany’s armed forces.

References 

Living people
1974 births
People from Koblenz
Social Democratic Party of Germany politicians
Members of the Bundestag 2021–2025
21st-century German politicians
University of Bonn alumni